The Dark Path may refer to:

 The Dark Path (Hunt novel), a novel by Walter H. Hunt
 The Dark Path (McIntee novel), a novel by David A. McIntee, based on the television series Doctor Who

See also
 Paths of Darkness, a series of novels